Christian Magdu (born 15 October 1977 in Ploieşti) is a Romanian-born Swedish actor.

A recognizable name and face in Sweden, Christian started working as an actor straight out of high school in the touring play "Europe 1697". Even though he studied sciences in high school it was the liberal arts and most of all theater, that was his great passion. He attended two famous, Swedish theater conservatories - Wendelsberg in 1998 and the highly prestigious, highly competitive Skara Skolscen in 2000. Christian describes Skara Skolscen as his most valuable time evolving as a new actor.

Magdu started out in feature films in 2002, with the premiere of Camp Slaughter in 2004, a film he also starred in and got rave reviews internationally. According to Internet Movie Database (IMDb) he has several international films in the works. He's starred and co-starred in over 10 feature films and won awards such as The Crystal Bear (Berlin for the short Aldrig en Absolution). He loves working high and low, mixing big budget theater releases with low budget indie flicks and loves working with talented and promising new filmmakers. He speaks five languages fluently and was selected Sweden's Hottest Male Actor by a Swedish Gay Magazine.

In 2007 Swedish film magazine Stardust - Allt om Film (nowadays Cinema) named Christian Magdu Talent of the Month (other recipients have included Emile Hirsch and Zooey Deschanel). Fall 2009 he can be seen in the drama-comedy feature Starring Maja (Prinsessa) and on the second season of the hit series Wrongfully Convicted (Oskyldigt Dömd) as well as in the final installments of hit series Johan Falk.

Selected films 

 2020 - The Pro
 2015 - Johan Falk: Slutet 
 2015 - Johan Falk: Lockdown
 2010 - Easy to Assemble: Finding North 
 2010 - Lost Tapes 
 2010 - True Blood (season 3)
 2009 - Syner
 2009 - Wrongfully Convicted (Oskyldigt Domd - TV-series)
 2009 - Starring Maja (Prinsessa)
 2008 - Dead on arrival
 2008 - Craig
 2007 - Judgement Day (short)
 2007 - Zapatos Nuevos 
 2006 - Beck - In the name of God
 2006 - Deja Vu
 2005 - The Medicine Man (mini-series, TV)
 2005 - Never an Absolution
 2003 - Blood red roses (TV)
 2004 - Camp Slaughter

External links 
 Christian Magdu, official web site
 Christian Magdu official page Swedish Agent & Management Group

References

1977 births
Living people
Swedish male actors
Swedish people of Romanian descent
Romanian emigrants to Sweden
People from Ploiești